NGC 551 is a spiral galaxy in the constellation Andromeda. It is estimated to be about 205 million light-years from the Milky Way. The object was discovered on 21, September 1786 by the German-British astronomer William Herschel.

See also 
 List of NGC objects (1–1000)

References

External links 
 

Spiral galaxies
551
Andromeda (constellation)
005450